Jeremy Solozano (born 5 October 1995) is a West Indian cricketer. He was part of the West Indies' squad for the 2014 ICC Under-19 Cricket World Cup. In May 2018, he was selected to play for the Trinidad and Tobago national cricket team in the Professional Cricket League draft, ahead of the 2018–19 season. In November 2019, he was named in Trinidad and Tobago's squad for the 2019–20 Regional Super50 tournament.

In November 2021, Solozano was named in the West Indies' Test squad for their series against Sri Lanka. He made his Test debut on 21 November 2021, for the West Indies against Sri Lanka. However, Solozano was stretchered off the field in the first session of the match, after being hit on the head while fielding.

References

External links
 

1995 births
Living people
West Indies Test cricketers
Trinidad and Tobago cricketers
Trinidad and Tobago representative cricketers
People from Arima